Kosovo–Lithuania relations involve foreign relations between the Republic of Kosovo and the Republic of Lithuania. Kosovo declared its independence from Serbia on 17 February 2008 and Lithuania recognized it on 6 May 2008. Diplomatic relations commenced on 16 July 2008.

Military

 Lithuania had 36 troops serving in Kosovo as peacekeepers in the NATO-led Kosovo Force. On November 30, 2009, Lithuania and Kosovo signed a military agreement to strengthen Kosovo's relationship with NATO and to bolster its independence.

On 30 November 2009 Kosovo and Lithuania strengthened military ties when their defence ministers met during a three-day visit to Lithuania.

See also 
 Foreign relations of Kosovo
 Foreign relations of Lithuania
 Albania–Lithuania relations
 Lithuania–Serbia relations

Notes and references
 Notes

 References

Lithuania
Bilateral relations of Lithuania